Julius Friedrich Seljamaa ( in Sindi – 17 June 1936 in Tallinn) was an Estonian politician, diplomat and journalist. From 1933 to 1936, he was the Estonian Minister of Foreign Affairs.

He was born in Sindi, Pärnu County. He studied from 1899 to 1902 in Riga and became a teacher and later director at a school in Taali from 1902 until 1909. From 1909 until 1914, he worked at a school in Rakvere. He then moved to Saint Petersburg to study law and work as a journalist. He graduated in 1918.

After that he began his diplomatic career shortly after the independence of Estonia in February 1918. Together with Johan Laidoner he became the Estonian representative to the Soviet Union and participated in the negotiations of the Treaty of Tartu in 1919 and 1920. From 1922 until 1928, he was the Estonian envoy in Latvia and in 1925 and 1926 also in Lithuania. From 1928 until 1933, he was the envoy in the Soviet Union. From 1933 until shortly before his death in 1936, he was the Estonian Minister of Foreign Affairs.

He died in Tallinn shortly he would have become the Estonian envoy in Rome. Seljamaa is buried at the Rahumäe cemetery in Tallinn.

References

External links
Biography 

1883 births
1936 deaths
People from Sindi, Estonia
People from the Governorate of Livonia
Estonian Labour Party politicians
Ministers of Foreign Affairs of Estonia
Members of the Estonian Provincial Assembly
Members of the Estonian Constituent Assembly
Members of the Riigikogu, 1920–1923
Ambassadors of Estonia to Latvia
Ambassadors of Estonia to Lithuania
Envoys of Estonia to the Soviet Union
Burials at Rahumäe Cemetery